"The Drug in Me Is You" is the second single from American rock band Falling in Reverse's debut studio album The Drug in Me Is You, which was released on June 28, 2011. The music video for the song had over 100 million views/streams on YouTube and Spotify.

An orchestral version entitled "The Drug in Me Is Reimagined" composed specially for Radke by pianist and composer Sean Rooney was released on February 13, 2020 to commemorate The Drug in Me Is You being certified gold by the Recording Industry Association of America (RIAA).

Background
The song was written and composed by Ronnie Radke. On June 21, 2011, a 33-second preview of the song was released, and the full song was released three days later. The music video released on June 28th shows Ronnie Radke leaving the room with a woman caressing him, to which he is later approached by two female police officers that take him to jail and court.

Accolades

Personnel
Credits adapted from Tidal.

Original version
Falling in Reverse
 Ronnie Radke — lead vocals
 Jacky Vincent — lead guitar
 Derek Jones — rhythm guitar, backing vocals
 Mika Horiuchi — bass, backing vocals (only appears in credits and music video)
 Ryan Seaman — drums, percussion, backing vocals (only appears in credits and music video)
 Nason Schoeffler — bass, backing vocals (uncredited performance)
 Scott Gee — drums, percussion, backing vocals (uncredited performance)
Additional personnel
 Michael "Elvis" Baskette — producer, songwriting
 Dave Holdredge — mixing, enginee, songwriting

Reimagined
Falling in Reverse
 Ronnie Radke — lead vocals, producer
 Max Georgiev — guitars
 Tyler Burgess — bass
 Johnny Mele — drums, percussion 
Additional personnel
 Tyler Smyth — producer
 Sean Rooney — piano, composition

Reimagined version

"The Drug in Me Is Reimagined" is the orchestral rock version of "The Drug in Me Is You", released on February 13, 2020 to commemorate The Drug in Me Is You being certified gold by RIAA. The music video, directed by Jensen Noen, shows Ronnie Radke playing the piano, featuring an orchestra of cellos.

Charts

References

2011 songs
Falling in Reverse songs
Songs written by Ronnie Radke
Songs written by Michael Baskette
Song recordings produced by Michael Baskette
Epitaph Records singles